Washington Township is one of the eighteen townships of Richland County, Ohio, United States.  It is a part of the Mansfield Metropolitan Statistical Area.  The 2000 census found 6,777 people in the township, 6,643 of whom lived in the unincorporated portions of the township.

Geography
Located in the southern part of the county, it borders the following townships:
Madison Township - north
Mifflin Township - northeast corner
Monroe Township - east
Worthington Township - southeast corner
Jefferson Township - south
Perry Township - southwest corner
Troy Township - west
Springfield Township - northwest corner

Parts of three municipalities are located in Washington Township: the city of Mansfield — the county seat of Richland County — in the north, the village of Bellville in the south, and the village of Lexington in the west.

Name and history
It is one of forty-three Washington Townships statewide.

Government
The township is governed by a three-member board of trustees, who are elected in November of odd-numbered years to a four-year term beginning on the following January 1. Two are elected in the year after the presidential election and one is elected in the year before it. There is also an elected township fiscal officer, who serves a four-year term beginning on April 1 of the year after the election, which is held in November of the year before the presidential election. Vacancies in the fiscal officership or on the board of trustees are filled by the remaining trustees.

Trustees
 Chairman: Dave Yoder
 Vice Chairman: Bob Entenmann
 Trustee: Jack Butler
 Fiscal Officer: Annette Depue
 Zoning Inspector: Tim Boggs

References

External links
Township website
County website

Townships in Richland County, Ohio
Townships in Ohio